Jahid Sheikh Ahmed (born 20 February 1986) is an English former first-class cricketer. He played as a right-handed lower order batsman and a right-arm medium-pace bowler.

Personal life 
Ahmed attended St Peter's High School in Burnham-on-Crouch before attending University of East London. He is a Muslim.

Career 
Ahmed made his debut for Essex County Cricket Club during the 2005 season, having represented Essex Cricket Board's under-17s team since 2003. He played in one first-class match of each during the 2005 and 2006 seasons. On his debut match in List A cricket, he contributed with a match-winning 4/32 against the touring Sri Lankans.

In 2010, Ahmed was selected as one of 21 players to form the first Unicorns squad to take part in the Clydesdale Bank 40 domestic limited overs competition against the regular first-class counties.

In 2021, he alleged that he faced racism, while playing for Essex.

See also
British Bangladeshi
List of British Bangladeshis

References

External links 

1986 births
Living people
British Asian cricketers
British Muslims
English people of Bangladeshi descent
English cricketers
Essex cricketers
Unicorns cricketers
Sportspeople from Chelmsford
Alumni of the University of East London